Bangaru Bullodu is a 1993 Indian Telugu-language drama film directed by Ravi Raja Pinisetty. It stars Nandamuri Balakrishna, Ramya Krishna, Raveena Tandon with music composed by Raj–Koti. The film was produced by V. B. Rajendra Prasad under the Jagapathi Art Pictures banner. It marks Raveena Tandon's first venture in Telugu cinema. The film released the same day as Nippu Ravva, which also starred Balakrishna. The film was recorded as a Hit at the box office.

Plot
The film begins with a maniac mortal terrorist Nana who abducts a group of school kids to recover his sibling Chinna. DIG Benerjee counterattacks with a rescue operation when Chinna dies in his hands. So, Nana is furious Nana surrenders expecting his men, and seeks for vengeance to destroy Benejee’s entire clan. Next, the story shifts to a village Pudipalli adjacent to the river Godavari. Balakrishna/Balaiah is valiant resides with his mother Annapurnamma and impedes racks of his maternal uncle Ramadasu. Anyhow, his daughter Rani hyper possessively darlings Balaiah and kicks out all girls near him. 

Meanwhile, Priya the daughter of Ram Mohan Rao the cousin of Annapurnamma arrives from abroad after a long time with a caretaker Tulasamma. Balaiah is infatuated with her and intimacy develops between them which begrudges Rani. Following, she blazes at Priya when the two bet that Priya will allure Balaiah into her love. Consequently, Rani confidently replies excluding her, he will not accept any girl’s hand. Therefrom, the game starts, and Priya & Rani complete. Priya gets close to Balaiah and counterfeits him employing love whom he wholeheartedly endears. On the occasion of a festival, their challenge level peaks. Priya asks Balaiah to pick her ring from an anthill to prove his love for her which he does so. But unfortunately, he is bitten by a snake and lies on a deathbed. Upon this, Priya repents and discloses the play. After reviving, indignant Balaiah forcibly ties the wedding chain Mangalasutram as retribution. 

Forthwith, as a flabbergast, Tulasamma is revealed as a cop who informs Commissioner Srikanth and he lands therein and makes a secret talk. Parallelly, a bunch of assassins under disguise wander in the hunt for Priya. Currently, she is averse to holding the wedding chain when Tulasamma compels her to be patient for a few days. Ramadasu overhears their conversation and starts blackmailing, therefore he is blocked under the prison. In the interim, Rani takes the fact as her fortune and yearns to unite Balaiah & Priya along with Annapurnamma but in vain. Subsequently, Priya is assaulted by felons when Balaiah guards her. After this, Priya realizes his virtue and proceeds to his home. However, Balaiah still keeps her far away. 

One night Balaiah finds something suspicious and explores the reality via Tulasamma. Shockingly, she divulges that Priya is not his cousin. Moreover, Priya turns out as the younger one Banerjee. Srikanth & Tulasi share beyond the official relationships with them. According to his sworn Nana massacred Benerjee’s family apart from Priya. As of today, the department admits a mission to bail out Priya and hide her at Pudipalli. Since it is the birthplace of Nana that he is unable to gaze. Listening to it, Balaiah words Tulasamma to protect Priya and the two gets nearer. Now the hanging day of Nana advances when he knows the whereabouts of Priya through Ramadasu in jail and flees. Besides, Srikanth wraps as a diabolic who keeps evil intent on Priya and extorts her slaying of Tulasamma. At last, Balaiah desists him when Nana also onslaughts and he ceases the baddies. Finally, the movie ends on a happy note with Balaiah's first night when Priya & Rani argues about a glass of milk.

Cast
Nandamuri Balakrishna as Bala Krishna / Balaiah
Raveena Tandon as Priya
Ramya Krishna as Rani
Rao Gopal Rao as Ramadasu
Allu Ramalingaiah as Kannappa
Sharat Saxena as Commissioner Srikanth
Devan as DIG Benerjee
Devaraj as Nana
Brahmanandam as Prisoner
Babu Mohan as Paatha dasu
Annapurna as Annapurnamma
Srividya as Tulasamma
Anitha as Ramadasu's wife
Master Baladitya

Soundtrack

Music was composed by Raj–Koti. Music released on Lahari Music Company.

References

External links 
 

1993 films
Films scored by Raj–Koti
1990s Telugu-language films
Indian romantic drama films
Films directed by Ravi Raja Pinisetty